Stefan Ahrens (born 17 September 1976) is a German diver. He competed in the 2000 Summer Olympics.

References

1976 births
Living people
Divers at the 2000 Summer Olympics
German male divers
Olympic divers of Germany
Sportspeople from Rostock